The 2022  Dallas Open was a men's tennis tournament played on indoor hard courts. It was the inaugural edition of the Dallas Open, and part of the ATP Tour 250 series on the 2022 ATP Tour. It took place at the Styslinger/Altec Tennis Complex in the city of Dallas, United States, between 7 and 13 February 2022. The ATP Tour returned to Dallas for the first time in almost 40 years, with this tournament replacing the New York Open. Second-seeded Reilly Opelka won the singles title.

Champions

Singles

  Reilly Opelka def.  Jenson Brooksby, 7–6(7–5), 7–6(7–3)

Doubles

  Marcelo Arévalo /  Jean-Julien Rojer def.  Lloyd Glasspool /  Harri Heliövaara, 7–6(7–4), 6–4

Points and prize money

Point distribution

Prize money 

*per team

Singles main draw entrants

Seeds 

 1 Rankings are as of 31 January 2022.

Other entrants 
The following players received wildcards into the main draw:
  Caleb Chakravarthi 
  Mitchell Krueger
  Jack Sock 

The following players received entry from the qualifying draw:
  Liam Broady 
  Vasek Pospisil 
  Jurij Rodionov 
  Cedrik-Marcel Stebe

Withdrawals 
Before the tournament
  Grigor Dimitrov → replaced by  Feliciano López
  James Duckworth → replaced by  Yoshihito Nishioka
  Kei Nishikori → replaced by  Oscar Otte
  Tommy Paul → replaced by  Kevin Anderson

Doubles main draw entrants

Seeds 

1 Rankings as of 31 January 2022.

Other entrants 
The following pairs received wildcards into the doubles main draw:
  John Isner /  Jack Sock
  Adam Neff /  Ivan Thamma

Withdrawals 
 Before the tournament
  Grigor Dimitrov /  John Isner → replaced by  Hans Hach Verdugo /  Miguel Ángel Reyes-Varela
  Nicholas Monroe /  Tommy Paul → replaced by  Denis Kudla /  Brayden Schnur
  Szymon Walków /  Jan Zieliński → replaced by  Evan King /  Alex Lawson

References

External links 
Tournament overview on ATP Tour website
Official website

Dallas Open
Dallas Open
Dallas Open
Dallas Open
Dallas Open (2022)